Christopher Paul Anthony Distefano (born August 26, 1984) is an American comedian. Primarily a stand-up comedian, Distefano began his career in entertainment on MTV and MTV2's shows Guy Code and Girl Code. Distefano's first hour-long standup special, Chris Distefano: Size 38 Waist, was released in 2019 by Comedy Central. His second special, Speshy Weshy, premiered on Netflix in May 2022. Distefano co-hosts Hey Babe! podcast with Impractical Jokers's Sal Vulcano and hosts his own podcast, Chrissy Chaos.

Early life
Distefano, who is of mostly German descent (and also has some Italian and Irish ancestry), grew up in the Ridgewood neighborhood of Queens and attended Archbishop Molloy High School. He then attended St. Joseph's College where he played basketball and studied psychology; he graduated in 2006. Distefano was recruited to play for St. Joseph's College Brooklyn's D-III basketball team in 2002. Distefano was the team's lead scorer, and was inducted into the college's Hall of Fame in 2018

Distefano earned a doctorate in physical therapy from New York Institute of Technology in 2010. He went on to practice pediatric physical therapy until 2013 when he began pursuing his career in comedy full-time.

Career
Distefano began performing standup in August of 2009. He hosted the 2010 Fencing Masters on the SNY network & Elite 8 of the 2011 and 2012 March Madness Comedy Competition at the comedy club Carolines on Broadway. He was selected to headline Carolines Breakout Artist Series and was selected as a finalist in the 2011 NY Comedy Festival. Besides Carolines, he also performed standup at venues including New York Comedy Club, Comedy Cellar, Gotham Comedy Club, Broadway Comedy Club, and the Laugh Lounge.

In 2012, Distefano joined the cast MTV's Guy Code, which was in its second season. The following year he also joined the cast of Girl Code. He would also go on to appear in episodes of other MTV shows like Guy Court, Guy Code vs. Girl Code, Off the Bat, and The Challenge. Distefano was a frequent guest on the Opie with Jim Norton show during this time. Chris went on to appear on Late Night with David Letterman in June of 2013. In 2014, Distefano's first half-hour special was released as part of Comedy Central's The Half Hour.

Following an appearance on Late Night with Seth Meyers, Distefano began his first national U.S. tour in September of 2015 with Monster Energy Outbreak Presents. He co-starred in the 2015 IFC series Benders with Andrew Schulz. He was one of two American announcers on Season 2 of Netflix's Ultimate Beastmaster, which was released on the streaming service on December 15, 2017. During this period, Distefano took part in seven television pilots which did not get picked up, including a CBS-produced show based on his own life called Distefano. Distefano also co-starred in the web series Bay Ridge Boys alongside fellow comic Yannis Pappas, with whom he also co-hosted the weekly history podcast History Hyenas, which was launched in February 2018.

Distefano regularly performs and tours globally. In January of 2019, his first hour standup special Chris Distefano: Size 38 Waist premiered on Comedy Central, which included a personal welcome on stage by Chazz Palminteri. The special was part of an overall deal he made with Comedy Central in December 2018, which included the series Stupid Questions with Chris Distefano, and at least two series in development. This also includes his weekly podcast Stand-Up with Chris Distefano, launched in April 2019. 

In February of 2022, Distefano sold out his first performance at New York City's Beacon Theatre. He would later go on to sell out his first two shows at the Gramercy Theatre that March, during which he recorded his second special, Speshy Weshy.

Distefano, an avid sports fan, has hosted episodes of shows including MLB's Off The Bat and MSG's The Brackets. He was invited by the New York Mets to throw the first game pitch in 2021 and set off the Vegas Golden Knights' pre-game siren alongside friend and fellow comedian Andrew Santino in March of 2022. Distefano was also featured on The Pat McAfee Show podcast, hosted by the athlete and sports commentator Pat McAfee in early April.

Personal life 
Distefano dated comedian Carly Aquilino from 2010 to 2014. Distefano has two children with Jasmine Canuelas.

Filmography

Discography 
Comedy specials

 Size 38 Waist (2019)
 Speshy Weshy (2022)

Podcasts

 History Hyenas with Yannis Pappas (2018–2021)
 Stand-Up with Chris Distefano (2019)
 Hey Babe! with Sal Vulcano (2020–present)
 Chrissy Chaos (2021–present)

References

External links

American male comedians
American stand-up comedians
Television personalities from New York City
American people of German descent
American people of Italian descent
American people of Irish descent
Living people
People from Brooklyn
New York Institute of Technology alumni
Comedians from New York (state)
21st-century American comedians
Archbishop Molloy High School alumni
1984 births